Hatlestrand Church is a parish church of the Church of Norway in Kvinnherad Municipality in Vestland county, Norway. It is located in the village of Hatlestrand. It is the church for the Hatlestrand parish which is part of the Sunnhordland prosti (deanery) in the Diocese of Bjørgvin. The white, wooden church was built in a long church design in 1885 using plans drawn up by the architects Conrad Fredrik von der Lippe and Kjartan Imsland. The church seats about 140 people.

History

The new parish of Hatlestrand was established in 1885 when it was separated from the Ølve Church parish. The new parish included the northern portion of Kvinnherad municipality located on the west side of the fjord. A new church was built in the village that same year. This would be the first church in this village. It was designed by Conrad Fredrik von der Lippe and Kjartan Imsland. The new building was consecrated in 1885.

See also
List of churches in Bjørgvin

References

Kvinnherad
Churches in Vestland
Long churches in Norway
Wooden churches in Norway
19th-century Church of Norway church buildings
Churches completed in 1885
1885 establishments in Norway